Niko nema ovakve ljude! (trans. No One Has This Kind of People!) is the live/video album by Serbian rock band Riblja Čorba, released in 2010. The album was recorded on the band's concert held on October 31, 2009 in Belgrade Arena. The album featured two CDs and one DVD with the recording of the concert.

Track listing

CDs

Disc 1
"Ravnodušan prema plaču"
"Radiću šta god hoću"
"Nojeva barka"
"Srbin je lud"
"Jedino moje"
"Poslednja pesma o tebi"
"Minut sa njom"
"Rock 'n' roll za kućni savet"
"Nemoj da ideš mojom ulicom"
"Volim, volim, volim, žene"
"Vetar duva, duva, duva"
"Dva dinara, druže"
"Nemoj, srećo, nemoj danas"
"Muško od plastelina"
"Rekla je"
"Al Kapone"

Disc 2
"Avionu, slomiću ti krila"
"Amsterdam"
"Krilati pegazi"
"Ostaću slobodan"
"Gde si u ovom glupom hotelu"
"Kad padne noć (Upomoć)"
"Pogledaj dom svoj, anđele"
"Bože, koliko je volim"
"Kad sam bio mlad"
"Ostani đubre do kraja"
"Lutka sa naslovne strane"
"Odlazim"
"Ljubav ovde više ne stanuje"
"Dobro jutro"

DVD
"Ravnodušan prema plaču"
"Radiću šta god hoću"
"Nojeva barka"
"Srbin je lud"
"Jedino moje"
"Poslednja pesma o tebi"
"Minut sa njom"
"Rock 'n' roll za kućni savet"
"Nemoj da ideš mojom ulicom"
"Volim, volim, volim, žene"
"Vetar duva, duva, duva"
"Dva dinara, druže"
"Nemoj, srećo, nemoj danas"
"Muško od plastelina"
"Rekla je"
"Al Kapone"
"Avionu, slomiću ti krila"
"Amsterdam"
"Krilati pegazi"
"Ostaću slobodan"
"Gde si u ovom glupom hotelu"
"Kad padne noć (Upomoć)"
"Pogledaj dom svoj, anđele"
"Bože, koliko je volim"
"Kad sam bio mlad"
"Ostani đubre do kraja"
"Lutka sa naslovne strane"
"Odlazim"
"Ljubav ovde više ne stanuje"
"Dobro jutro"

Personnel
Bora Đorđević - vocals
Vidoja Božinović - guitar
Miša Aleksić - bass guitar
Miroslav Milatović - drums
Nikola Zorić - keyboards, editor

Additional personnel
Dajana Ivin - backing vocals
Dubravka Petrović - backing vocals
Dušan Zrnić - backing vocals
Nebojša Radosavljević - director (video)
Boris Jovanović - engineer
Boris Krstajić - engineer
Dejan Škopelja - engineer
Nemanja Novaković - editor (video)

References

External links 
Niko nema ovakve ljude! at Discogs

Riblja Čorba live albums
2010 live albums